This is a list of the ministers general of the Order of Friars Minor.

Ministers General up to 1517

 Francis of Assisi (1210–1226) 
 Giovanni Parenti (1227–1232) 1st Minister General
 Elias of Cortona (1232–1239) 2nd Minister General
 Albert of Pisa (1239–1240) 3rd Minister General
 Haymo of Faversham (1240–1243) 4th Minister General
 Crescentius of Jesi (1244–1247) 5th Minister General
 Johannes of Parma (1247–1257) 6th Minister General
 Bonaventura of Bagnoreggio (1257–1274) 7th Minister General
 Girolamo Masci d'Ascoli (1274–1279), later Pope Nicholas IV, 8th Minister General
 Bonagratia of Bologna (1279–1285), 9th Minister General
 Arlotto of Prato (1285–1287), 10th Minister General
 Matteo de Acquasparta (1287–1289), 11th Minister General
 Raimund Godefroy (1289–1295), 12th Minister General
 Giovanni Mincio of Murrovalle (1296–1304), 13th Minister General
 Gonsalvus Hispanus (1304–1313), 14th Minister General
 Alessandro Bonini di Alessandria (1313–1314), 15th Minister General
 Michael of Cesena (1316–1328), 16th Minister General
Cardinal Bertrand de Turre (1328–1329), general Vicar
 Gerardo Odónis (1329–1342), 17th Minister General
 Fortanerio de Vassal (1343–1348), 18th Minister General
 Guillaume Farinier (1348–1357), 19th Minister General
 Juan Bouchier (1357–1358), 20th Minister General
 Marcus of Viterbo (1359–1366), 21st Minister General
 Thomas of Frignano (1367–1372), 22nd Minister General
 Leonardo Rossi (1373–1378), 23rd Minister General

During the Great Schism, the following ministers general headed the order in the Roman obedience:

 Ludovico Donati (1379–1383), 24th Minister General
 Pietro da Conzano (1383–1384), 25th Minister General
 Martino Sangiorgio de Rivarolo (1384–1387), 26th Minister General
 Enrico Alfieri (1387–1405), 27th Minister General
 Antonio Vinitti de Pereto (1405–1408), 28th Minister General
Angelo Salvetti (1408–1409), general Vicar 
 Antonio da Cascia (1410–1415), 29th Minister General (for the first year general Vicar)
 Antonio Vinitti de Pereto (1415–1420), second appointment

At the same time, the following presided over the order in the obedience of Avignon:

 Angelo di Spoleto (1379–1391)
 John Chevegneyo (1391–1402)
 Giovanni Bardolini (1403–1417)

After the conclusion of the schism, the order was reunited under Antonio Vinitti.

 Angelo Salvetti (1421–1424), 30th Minister General
 Antonio da Massa Marittima (1424–1430), 31st Minister General
 Guillermo Robazoglio da Casale (1430–1442), 32nd Minister General
Alberto Berdini de Sarteano (1442–1443) ( general Vicar)
 Antonio Rusconi (1443–1449), 33rd Minister General
 Angel Cristofori del Toscano (1450–1453), 34th Minister General
 Jacob Bassolini de Mozzanica (1454–1457), 35th Minister General
 Jaime Zarzuela (1458–1464), 36th Minister General
 Francesco della Rovere (1464–1469), 37th Minister General, later Pope Sixtus IV.
 Zanetto de Udine (1469–1475), 38th Minister General
 Francesco Nanni called Samson (1475–1499), 39th Minister General
 Egidio Delfini de Amelia (1500–1506), 40th Minister General
 Rainaldo Graziani de Cotignola (1506–1510), 41st Minister General
 Felipe Porcacci de Bagnacavallo (1510–1511), 42nd Minister General
Gomez de Lisboa (1511–1512), general Vicar
 Bernardino Prati (1511–1517), 43rd Minister General (for the first year as general Vicar)

Ministers General of the Friars Minor (OFM)
 Cristoforo Numai (1517–1518), 44th Minister General
 Francesco Lichetto (1518–1520), 45th Minister General
 Paolo da Soncino (1520–1523), 46th Minister General (for the first year as general Vicar)
 Francisco de Quiñones, 47th Minister General (1523–1527)
Antonio de Calcena (1527–1529), general Vicar
 Paolo Pisotti (1529–1533), 48th Minister General
 Vincenzo Lunello (1535–1541), 49th Minister General
 Giovanni Matteo de Calvi (1541–1547), 50th Minister General
 Andreas Alvarez (1547–1553), 51st Minister General
 Clemente Dolera (1553–1557), 52nd Minister General
(An unknown general Vicar) (1557–1559)
 Francisco Zamora de Cuenca (1559–1565), 53rd Minister General
 Aloisio Pozzi da Borgonuovo (1565–1571), 54th Minister General
 Christopher de Chaffontaines (1571–1579), 55th Minister General
 Francisco Gonzaga (1579–1587), 56th Minister General, Chronist
 Francisco de Tolosa (1587–1593), 57th Minister General
 Bonaventura Secusi da Caltagirone (1593–1600), 58th Minister General
 Francisco Susa de Toledo (1600–1606), 59th Minister General
 Arcangelo Gualterio de Messina (1606–1612), 60th Minister General
 Juan Hierro (1612–1613), 61st Minister General
Antonio de Trejo (1613–1618), general Vicar
 Benigno de Genova (1618–1625), 62nd Minister General
 Bernardino of Senna (1625–1631), 63rd Minister General
 Giovanni Battista de Campania (1633–1639), 64th Minister General
 Juan Marinero de Madrid (1639–1645), 65th Minister General
 Giovanni Mazzara, 1645–1648, 66th Minister General
 Pedro Manero (1651–1655), 67th Minister General
 Michaelangelo Buongiorno de Sambuca (1658–1664), 68th Minister General
 Ildefonso Salizanes (1664–1670), 69th Minister General
 Francesco Maria Rhini (1670–1674), 70th Minister General
 Francesco Maria Nicolis (1674–1676), 71st Minister General
 Jose Ximenes Samaniego (1676–1682), 72nd Minister General
 Pietro Marini Sormani (1682–1688), 73rd Minister General
 Marcos de Zarzosa (1688–1690), 74th Minister General
 Juan Aluin (1690–1694), 75th Minister General
 Bonaventura Poerio de Taverna (1694–1697), 76th Minister General
 Matteo de Santo Stefano (1697–1700), 77th Minister General
 Luis Torres (1700–1701), 78th Minister General
 Ildefonso Biesma (1702–1716), 79th Minister General
 Jose Garcia (1717–1723), 80th Minister General
 Lorenzo Cozza de S. Lorenzo (1723–1726), 81st Minister General
 Matteo Basile de Parete (1727–1729), 82nd Minister General
 Juan Soto de Valladolid (1729–1736), 83rd Minister General
 Juan Bermejo (1736–1740), 84th Minister General
 Gaetano Politi de Laurino (1740–1744), 85th Minister General
 Rafaello Rossi de Lugagnano (1744–1750), 86th Minister General
 Pedro Juanete de Molina (1750–1756), 87th Minister General
 Clemente Guignoni de Palermo (1756–1762), 88th Minister General
 Pedro Juanete de Molina (1762–1768), 89th Minister General (second appointment)
 Pasquale Frasconi de Varese (1768–1791), 90th Minister General
 Joaquin de Campany i Soler (1792–1806), 91st Minister General
 Ilario Cervelli de Montemagno (1806–1814), 92nd Minister General
 Gaudenzio Patrignani e Coriano (1814–1817), 93rd Minister General
 Cirilo Alameda y Brea (1817–1824), 94th Minister General
 Giovanni Tecca de Capestrano (1824–1830), 95th Minister General
 Luis Iglesias (1830–1834), 96th Minister General
 Bartolome Altemir (1835–1838), 97th Minister General
 Giuseppe Maria Maniscalco (1838–1844), 98th Minister General
 Luigi Flamini de Loreto (1844–1850), 99th Minister General
 Venanzio Metildi de Celano (1850–1856), 100th Minister General
 Bernardino Trionfetti de Montefranco (1856–1832), 101st Minister General
 Rafaele Lippi de Pontecci Marconi (1862–1869), 102nd Minister General
 Bernardino dal Vago da Portogruaro (1869–1889), 103rd Minister General
 Luigi da Parma (1889–1897), 104th Minister General
 Aloysius Lauer (1897–1901), 105th Minister General
David Fleming (1901–1915), general Vicar
 Dionysius Schüler (1903–1911), 106th Minister General
 Pacifico Monza (1911–1915), 107th Minister General
 Serafino Cimino da Capri (1915–1921), 108th Minister General
 Bernardino Klumper (1921–1927), 109th Minister General
 Bonaventura Marrani (1927–1933), 110th Minister General
 Leonardo Bello (1933–1944), 111th Minister General
Policarp Schmoll (1944–1945), general Vicar
 Valentine Theodore Schaaf (1945–1946), 112th Minister General
 Pacifico Perantoni (1947–1952), 113th Minister General
 Augustin-Joseph Sépinski (1952–1965), 114th Minister General
 Constantin Koser (1965–1979), 115th Minister General (for the first two years as general Vicar)
 John Vaughn (1979–1991), 116th Minister General
 Hermann Schalück (1991–1997), 117th Minister General
 Giacomo Bini (1997–2003), 118th Minister General
 José Rodríguez Carballo (2003–2013), 119th Minister General
 Michael Anthony Perry (2013-2021), 120th Minister General
 Massimo Fusarelli (Since 2021), 121st Minister General

Ministers General of the Conventuals (OFM Conv.)
 Antonio Macelo de Petris de Cherso (1517–1520), 44th Minister General
 Antonio Sassolini (1520–1525), 45th Minister General
 Juan Vigerio (1525–1530), 46th Minister General (first 4 years general Vicar)
 Jaime Antonio Ferduzzi (1530–1537), 47th Minister General (first 4 years general Vicar)
 Lorenzo Spada (1537–1543), 48th Minister General
 Buenaventura Fauni-Pio (1543–1549), 49th Minister General
 Juan Jaime Passeri (1549–1551), 50th Minister General
 Julio Magnani (1551–1559), 51st Minister General (first 4 years general Vicar)
 Juan Antonio Muratori de Cervia (1559–1559), 52nd Minister General
Juan Antonio Delfini (1559–1561), general Vicar
 Antonio de' Sapienti (1561–1566), 53rd Minister General (first year as general Vicar)
 Felix Peretti de Montalto (1566–1568), general Vicar, later Pope Sixtus V
 Juan Tancredi (1568–1568), 54th Minister General
 Juan Pico (1568–1574), 55th Minister General (first 3 years general Vicar)
 Pietro Antonio Camilli (1575–1580), 56th Minister General
 Antonio Fera (1581–1584), 57th Minister General
 Clemente Bontadosi (1584–1586), 58th Minister General
 Evangelista Pellei (1586–1590), 59th Minister General (first year as general Vicar)
 Julian Causi (1590–1590), 60th Minister General
 Francisco Bonfigli (1590–1591), 61st Minister General
Ludovico Albuzzi (1592–1593), general Vicar
 Felipe Gesualdi (1593–1602), 62nd Minister General
 Jose Pisculli (1602–1607), 63rd Minister General
 Guillermo Huges de Avignon (1608–1612), 64th Minister General
 Jaime Montanari (1612–1622), 65th Minister General (first 5 years general Vicar)
 Miguel Misserotti (1622–1623), 66th Minister General
 Felix Franceschini (1625–1632), 67th Minister General
 Juan Bautista Berardicelli (1632–1647), 68th Minister General (first 3 years general Vicar)
 Miguel Angel Catalani (1647–1653), 69th Minister General
 Felix Gabrielli (1653–1659), 70th Minister General
 Jaime Fabretti (1659–1665), 71st Minister General
 Andres Bini (1665–1670), 72nd Minister General
 Marcial Pelegrini de Castrovilari (1670–1677), 73rd Minister General
 Jose Amati (1677–1683), 74th Minister General
 Antonio Aversani (1683–1689), 75th Minister General
 Jose Maria Bottari, 76th Minister General
 Felix Rotondi (1695–1701), 77th Minister General
 Vicente Maria Coronelli (1701–1707), 78th Minister General
Carlo Bacciocchi (1701–1704), general Vicar for Vicente Coronelli
 Bernardino Angelo Carucci (1707–1713), 79th Minister General
 Domingo Andrea Borghesi (1713–1718), 80th Minister General
Jose M. Baldrati (1718–1719), general Vicar
 Carlos Jaime Romilli (1719–1725), 81st Minister General
 Jose M. Baldrati (1725–1731), 82nd Minister General
 Vicente Conti (1731–1738), 83rd Minister General
Felix Angel Sidori (1738–1741), general Vicar
 Juan Bautista Minucci (1741–1747), 84th Minister General
 Carlos Antonio Calvi (1747–1753), 85th Minister General
 Juan Bautista Costanzo (1753–1759), 86th Minister General
 Juan Bautista Columbini (1759–1764), 87th Minister General
 Domingo Andrea Rossi (1764–1771), 88th Minister General (first year general Vicar)
 Luis Maria Marzoni (1771–1777), 89th Minister General
 Juan Carlos Vipera (1777–1783), 90th Minister General
 Federico Lauro Barbarigo (1783–1789), 91st Minister General
 Jose Maria Medici (1789–1795), 92nd Minister General
 Buenaventura Bartoli (1795–1803), 93rd Minister General
 Nicolas Papini (1803–1809), 94th Minister General
 Jose Maria de Bonis (1809–1824), 95th Minister General
 Luis Battistini (1824–1830), 96th Minister General
 Domingo Secondi (1830–1832), 97th Minister General
Francisco Antonio Orioli (1832–1833), general Vicar
 Antonio Pablo Barbetti (1833–1839), 98th Minister General
 Angel Bigoni (1839–1845), 99th Minister General
 Jose Carlos Magni (1845–1851), 100th Minister General
 Jacinto Gualerni (1851–1857), 101st Minister General
 Salvador Calí (1857–1864), 102nd Minister General
 Ludovico Marangoni (1864–1872), 103rd Minister General (first two years as general Vicar)
 Antonio Maria Adragna (1872–1879), 104th Minister General
 Buenaventura Maria Soldatic de Cherso (1879–1891), 105th Minister General
 Lorenzo Caratelli (1891–1904), 106th Minister General
 Dominic Reuter (1904–1910), 107th Minister General
 Victor Maria Sottaz (1910–1919), 108th Minister General
Francisco Dall'Olio (1913–1919), general Vicar
 Domingo Maria Tavani (1919–1924), 109th Minister General

 Alfonso Orlich (Orlini)	(1924–1930), 110th Minister General
 Domingo Maria Tavani (1930–1936), 111th Minister General (second term of office)
 Beda Maria Hess (1936–1953), 112th Minister General 
Buenavista Mansi (1953–1954), general Vicar
 Victor Maria Costantini (1954–1960), 113th Minister General
 Basilio Maria Heiser (1960–1972), 114th Minister General 
 Vitale Maria Bonmarco (1972–1984), 115th Minister General 
 Lanfranco Serrini (1984–1996), 116th Minister General 
 Agostino Gardin (1996–2002), 117th Minister General
 Joachim Giermek (2002–2007), 118th Minister General
 Marco Tasca (2007-2019), 119th Minister General
 Carlos Alberto Trovarelli (since 2019), 120th Minister General

General Vicars and Ministers General of the Capuchins (OFMcap)
 Mateo de Bascio (1529), 1st general Vicar
 Ludovico de Fossombrone (1529–1535), 2nd general Vicar
 Bernardino de Asti (1535–1538), 3rd general Vicar
 Bernardino Ochino (1538–1542), 4th general Vicar
 Francisco de Iesi (1542–1546), 5th general Vicar
 Bernardino de Asti (1546–1552), (second term)
 Eusebio de Ancona (1552–1558), 6th general Vicar
 Tomas de Citta de Castello (1558–1564), 7th general Vicar
 Evangelista de Cannobio (1564–1567), 8th general Vicar
 Mario de Mercato Saraceno (1567–1573), 9th general Vicar, Chronist
 Vicente de Monte d’Olmo (1573–1574), 10th general Vicar
 Jeronimo de Montefiore (1574–1581), 11th general Vicar
 Juan Maria de Tusa (1581–1584), 12th general Vicar
 Santiago de Mercato Saraceno (1584–1587), 13th general Vicar
 Jeronimo da Polizzi (1587–1593), 14th general Vicar
 Silvestre de Monteleone (1593–1596), 15th general Vicar
 Jeronimo de Sorbo (1596–1599), 16th general Vicar
 Jeronimo de Castelferretti (1599–1602), 17th general Vicar
 San Lorenzo de Brindisi (1602–1605), 18th general Vicar
 Silvestre d’Assisi (1605–1608), 19th general Vicar
Jeronimo de Castelferetti (1608–1613), 2nd Amtszeit
 Pablo de Cesena (1613–1618), 20th general Vicar
 Clemente de Noto (1618–1619), 21st general Vicar
 Clemente de Noto (1619–1625), Minister General
 Juan Maria de Noto (1625–1631), 22nd Minister General
Jeronimo de Narni (1631–1632), general Vicar
Francisco de Genova (1632–1634), general Vicar
 Antonio de Modena (1634–1637), 23rd Minister General
 Juan de Moncalieri (1637–1643), 24th Minister General
 Inocencio de Caltagirone (1643–1650), 25th Minister General
 Fortunato de Cadore (1650–1656), 26th Minister General
 Simpliciano de Milan (1656–1662), 27th Minister General
 Marco Antonio de Carpenedolo (1662–1665), 28th Minister General
Fortunato de Cadore (1665–1667), general Vicar
 Fortunato de Cadore (1667–1669), (second term)
Buenaventura de Recanati (1669–1671), general Vicar
 Esteban de Cesena (1671–1678), 29th Minister General
 Bernardo de Porto Maurizio (1678–1684), 30th Minister General
Buenaventura de Recanati (1684–1685), general Vicar
 Carlos Maria de Macerata (1685–1691), 31st Minister General
 Bernardino de Arezzo (1691–1698), 32nd Minister General 
 Juan Pedro de Busto Arsizio (1698–1700), 33rd Minister General
Angelicus von Wolfach (1700–1702), general Vicar
 Agustin de Latisana (1702–1709), 34th Minister General
 Bernardino de Saluzzo (1709–1710), 35th Minister General
Juan Antonio de Florencia (1710–1712), general Vicar
 Miguel Angel de Ragusa (1712–1719), 36th Minister General
 Juan Antonio de Florencia (1719–1721), 37th Minister General
Bernardino de Sant'Angelo in Vado (1721–1726), general Vicar
 Hartman de Bressanone (1726–1731), 38th Minister General
 Buenventura de Ferrara (1731–1740), 39th Minister General
 Jose Maria de Terni (1740–1747), 40th Minister General
 Segismundo de Ferrara (1747–1753), 41st Minister General
Gelasio de Gorizia (1753–1754), general Vicar
 Serafin von Ziegenhals (1754–1761), 42nd Minister General
 Pablo de Colindres (1761–1766), 43rd Minister General
Jose Maria de Savorgnano (1766–1768), general Vicar
 Amado de Lamballe (1768–1773), 44th Minister General
 Erhard de Radkesburg (1773–1789), 45th Minister General (first two years general Vicar)
 Angelico de Sassuolo (1789–1796), 46th Minister General
 Nicolas de Bustillo (1796–1806), 47th Minister General
 Miguel Angel de San Sepolcro (1806–1814), 48th Minister General
Mariano de Alatri (1814–1818), general Vicar
 Francisco de Solchaga (1818–1824), 49th Minister General
 Ludovico de Frascati (1824–1830), 50th Minister General
 Juan de Valencia (1830–1838), 51st Minister General
 Eugenio de Rumilly (1838–1844), 52nd Minister General
 Luis de Bagnaia (1844–1845), 53rd Minister General
Andres de Arezzo (1845–1847), general Vicar
 Venancio de Turin (1847–1853), 54th Minister General
 Salvador de Ozieri (1853–1859), 55th Minister General
 Nicolas de San Juan en Marignano (1859–1872), 56th Minister General
 Gil de Cortona (1872–1884), 57th Minister General
 Bernardo de Andermatt (1884–1908), 58th Minister General
 Pacifico de Seggiano (1908–1914), 59th Minister General
 Venancio de Lisle-en-Rigault (1914–1920), 60th Minister General
 Juan Antonio de San Juan en Persiceto (1920–1926), 61st Minister General
 Melchor de Benisa (1926–1932), 62nd Minister General
 Virgilio de Valstagna (1932–1938), 63rd Minister General
 Donatus von Welle (1938–1946), 64th Minister General
 Clement of Milwaukee (1946–1952), 65th Minister General
 Benigno de S. Ilario Milanese (1952–1958), 66th Minister General
 Clement of Milwaukee (1958–1964), 67th Minister General (second term)
 Clementinus von Vlissingen (1964–1970), 68th Minister General
 Pascual Rywalski (1970–1982), 69th Minister General
 Flavio Roberto Carraro (1982–1994), 70th Minister General
 John Dennis Corriveau (1994–2006), 71st Minister General
 Mauro Jöhri (2006-2018), 72nd Minister General
 Roberto Genuin (since 2018), 73rd Minister General

References

Ministers General